The 2005 MAC Championship Game was played on December 1, 2005 at Ford Field in Detroit, Michigan. The game featured the Akron Zips, winners of the Mid-American Conference East Division, and the Northern Illinois Huskies, winners of the West Division.

Down 14 points the fourth quarter, the Zips manufactured a comeback. Northern Illinois led by 6 points with 17 seconds remaining in regulation when Luke Getsy connected with Domenik Hixon on a 36-yard touchdown pass. This and the subsequent successful extra point attempt would prove to be the game winning plays. Their victory earned the Akron football program its first MAC championship and bowl game berth.

References

Championship Game
MAC Championship Game
Akron Zips football games
Northern Illinois Huskies football games
American football competitions in Detroit
December 2005 sports events in the United States
MAC Championship
2005 in Detroit